The 2019–20 season was Cardiff City's 121st season in their existence and their first back in the EFL Championship. Cardiff were relegated to the second tier of English football after finishing 18th in the 2018–19 Premier League. Along with competing in the EFL Championship, the club also participated in the FA Cup and EFL Cup. The season covered the period from 1 July 2019 to 30 July 2020.

On 11 November 2019, Neil Warnock resigned as manager, Cardiff were 14th in the league, he was later replaced by Neil Harris on 16 November.

Due to the COVID-19 virus outbreak, all English football leagues were postponed until 30 April. The season restarted on 20 June 2020.

First-team squad

 Appearances and goals for the club and contracts are up to date as of 31 July 2020.

Statistics

  

|-
!colspan=14|Players who left the club:

 

|}

Goals record

Disciplinary record

Contracts

Transfers

Transfers in

 Spent  - Undisclosed (~ £13,600,000)

Loans in

Loans out

Transfers out

 Income : Undisclosed (~ £11,000,000)

Pre-season
The Bluebirds announced pre-season fixtures against Taff's Well, San Antonio, New Mexico United, Real Valladolid and OGC Nice.

Competitions

Championship

League table

Results summary

Results by matchday

Matches
On Thursday, 20 June 2019, the EFL Championship fixtures were revealed.

Play-Offs

FA Cup

The second round draw was made live on BBC Two from Etihad Stadium, Micah Richards and Tony Adams conducted the draw.

EFL Cup

The second round draw was made on 13 August 2019 following the conclusion of all but one first round matches.

Summary

Club staff

Backroom staff

Board of directors

References

Cardiff City F.C. seasons
Cardiff City
Cardiff
Cardiff City F.C. 2019-20